Kheyrabad (also Romanized as Kheyrābād) is a village in Jolgeh-ye Chah Hashem Rural District, Jolgeh-ye Chah Hashem District, Dalgan County, Sistan and Baluchestan Province, Iran. At the 2006 census, its population was 382, in 74 families.

References 

Populated places in Dalgan County